Michael Hofmann (born 3 November 1972) is a Germany football manager and former football player, who is goalkeeper coach of Türkgücü München.

Throughout his career, he played for SpVgg Bayreuth and 1860 Munich. He also spent time at SSV Jahn Regensburg as a player and coach.

Playing career

After his contract at TSV 1860 München was not renewed Hofmann joined 3. Liga club SSV Jahn Regensburg.

Managerial career
On 11 June 2014, Hofmann was named as the new manager of Kirchheimer SC.

References

External links

 
 

1972 births
Living people
Sportspeople from Bayreuth
German footballers
Association football goalkeepers
Bundesliga players
2. Bundesliga players
3. Liga players
TSV 1860 Munich players
SSV Jahn Regensburg players
Footballers from Bavaria
Türkgücü München players